The year 2008 is the 2nd year in the history of Palace Fighting Championship, a mixed martial arts promotion based in the United States. In 2008 PFC held 10 events beginning with, PFC 6: No Retreat, No Surrender.

Events list

PFC 6: No Retreat, No Surrender

PFC 6: No Retreat, No Surrender was an event held on January 17, 2008 at the Tachi Palace in Lemoore, California, United States.

Results

PFC: Olson vs. Alfonso

PFC: Olson vs. Alfonso was an event held on February 29, 2008 at the Tachi Palace in Lemoore, California, United States.

Results

PFC 7: Palace Fighting Championship 7

PFC 7: Palace Fighting Championship 7 was an event held on March 20, 2008 at the Tachi Palace in Lemoore, California, United States.

Results

PFC 7.5: New Blood

PFC 7.5: New Blood was an event held on April 26, 2008 at the Eagle Mountain Casino in Porterville, California, United States.

Results

PFC 8: A Night of Champions

PFC 8: A Night of Champions was an event held on May 8, 2008 at the Tachi Palace in Lemoore, California, United States.

Results

PFC 9: The Return

PFC 9: The Return was an event held on July 7, 2008 at the Tachi Palace in Lemoore, California, United States.

Results

PFC: Bias vs. Blood

PFC: Bias vs. Blood was an event held on August 21, 2008 at the Tachi Palace in Lemoore, California, United States.

Results

PFC 10: Explosive

PFC 10: Explosive was an event held on September 26, 2008 at the Tachi Palace in Lemoore, California, United States.

Results

PFC: Martinez vs. Lorenz

PFC: Martinez vs. Lorenz was an event held on October 23, 2008 at the Tachi Palace in Lemoore, California, United States.

Results

PFC 11: All In

PFC 11: All In was an event held on November 20, 2008 at the Tachi Palace in Lemoore, California, United States.

Results

See also 
 Palace Fighting Championship

References

Palace Fighting Championship events
2008 in mixed martial arts